Sir Christopher Andrew Hoy MBE (born 23 March 1976) is a former track cyclist and racing driver from Scotland who represented Great Britain at the Olympic and World Championships and Scotland at the Commonwealth Games.

Hoy is eleven-times a world champion and six-times an Olympic champion. With a total of seven Olympic medals, six gold and one silver, Hoy is the second most decorated Olympic cyclist of all time. Between 2012 and 2021 he was the most successful British Olympian and the most successful Olympic cyclist of all time. In 2021 he finally ceded both records to erstwhile colleague and rival Sir Jason Kenny. His seventeen global titles across four disciplines make Hoy the most successful track cyclist at the global level of all times.

With his three gold medals in 2008 Summer Olympics, Hoy became Scotland's most successful Olympian, the first British athlete to win three gold medals in a single Olympic Games since Henry Taylor in 1908, and the most successful Olympic cyclist of all time. After winning a further two gold medals (in the keirin and team sprint) at the 2012 Summer Olympics, Hoy has won the second most Olympic gold medals (six) of all British athletes, behind Jason Kenny, and more total medals (seven) than any except fellow cyclists Kenny and Sir Bradley Wiggins. Hoy has won Olympic gold medals in more separate events - four (team sprint (twice), match sprint, kierin (twice) and kilo) than any other Briton or any other cyclist.

Early life
The son of David and Carol Hoy. Chris Hoy grew up in the suburb of Murrayfield, Edinburgh, and was privately educated at George Watson's College, followed by two years at the University of St Andrews studying Mathematics and Physics until 1996. He subsequently transferred to the University of Edinburgh, from which he graduated BSc (Hons.) in Applied Sports Science in 1999.

Hoy, whose first bike cost £5, was inspired to cycle at age six by the 1982 film E.T. the Extra-Terrestrial. Hoy says the BMX bike he saw in the film is what inspired him to start cycling. Before track cycling, Hoy raced BMX between the ages of 7 and 14 and was ranked second in Britain, fifth in Europe, and ninth in the world. He received sponsorship from Slazenger and Kwik-Fit, and was competing in Europe and the U.S. He first became aware of track cycling when he watched TV coverage of Scottish sprinter Eddie Alexander winning a bronze medal at the 1986 Commonwealth Games in Edinburgh. Hoy also represented the Scotland Junior Rowing Team and was second in the 1993 National Rowing Championships with Grant Florence in the coxless pairs. He played rugby as part of his school's team.

Early cycling career
Hoy joined his first cycling club, Dunedin C.C., in 1990, aged 14, and began concentrating on track cycling in 1993, when he joined the City of Edinburgh Racing Club. In 1997, he and fellow Scottish sprinter Craig MacLean were tipped as medal prospects by Phil Liggett.

Hoy won silver in Berlin, at the 1999 UCI Track Cycling World Championships in the team sprint, riding at man one, Craig MacLean at 2 and Jason Quealley at 3. Regular teammates in the team sprint over the years have included Craig MacLean, Ross Edgar, Jamie Staff, Jason Queally, Matthew Crampton and Jason Kenny.

Olympics

2000 Sydney Olympics
Following Jason Queally's gold medal in the Kilo TT early in the Games, Hoy joined with him and Craig MacLean to win his first Olympic Medal, a Silver in the Team Sprint or "Olympic Sprint" as it was then called. Although they were beaten by an excellent French team, the two medals won for GB were to become the start of a renaissance of British track cycling after the debacle of the Atlanta Games, for which he and track endurance contemporary Sir Bradley Wiggins would eventually become the figureheads along with road sprinter Mark Cavendish. All three would eventually win BBC Sports Personality of the Year as cycling became mainstream in Great Britain.

2004 Olympics: Athens
Hoy arrived in Athens in the form of his life. His main event was the Kilo Time Trial. He was ranked No 1 and was last man off. The sea level World Record was broken four times as he sat in the track centre waiting for his start. He had been involved in an accident in the athlete's village just a few days prior to competition where he came off his bike in front of a village bus, narrowly avoiding serious injury. As he came out of the starting gate, his scarred arms and legs showed how close he was to not competing.

The previous rider was Arnaud Tournant who set the fastest ever sea-level kilo. Chris came next and, cheered on by thousands of loyal British fans, he bettered the time on each lap, setting a new sea-level World and Olympic Record of 1.00.711. This was the first of his Olympic gold medals, but he suffered disappointment as Great Britain could only finish fifth in the Team Sprint.

Post-2004 Olympics
Angered by the decision to remove his specialist event, the Kilo, from the Olympic programme after the 2004 games, Hoy sought to develop in other events. The first of these was the emerging keirin event This event involves between six and eight riders following a small motorbike (the Derny) around the 250m track for 5.5 laps, as the bike slowly builds up the speed. The bike pulls off with 2.5 laps to go and the riders race for the line. Hoy had previously competed at the keirin in various events but one of his first major successes was at the Manchester round of the World Cup Classics Series in 2007, shortly before the World Championships, where he also won, ahead of his teammate Ross Edgar.

This showed that Hoy was developing from just a pure power sprinter, in events like the Kilo and Team Sprint, into also being one of the best in the world at more tactical sprinting events such as the keirin and the individual sprint. His success in the new events, however, was still marked by Hoy's ability to  generate extraordinary power.

2007 world record attempt
On 12 May 2007, Hoy attempted the world record for the kilometre. He fell 0.005 seconds short, clocking 58.880. He set a record for the 500m flying start at 24.758 seconds, over a second less than the 25.850 set by Arnaud Duble. Hoy set the sea-level kilometre record of 1 minute 0.711 seconds by winning the Olympics in Athens in 2004. The outright record of 58.875 seconds is held by Arnaud Tournant (France), set during 2001 at altitude in La Paz, Bolivia, where Hoy also attempted to break the record. At the time, only 3 sub-60sec kilos had ever been ridden; Hoy recorded two of these over two days in La Paz.

Hoy's main achievement is his development in the individual sprint event considered to be the blue riband event of track cycling. Kilo riders like Hoy have historically not fared as well at this event, as they were less experienced in the tactical elements required for the sprint. Previously, Hoy had competed in the sprint at various World Cup events and Revolution meetings in Manchester, but it was not one of his main events and he did not compete in it at the World Championships or the Olympics.

In the semi finals Hoy defeated Italian veteran Roberto Chiappa 2–0, to set up a meeting in the final against France's Kévin Sireau. Sireau was the World Cup Classics points winner for the season and had defeated Hoy 2–0 in their previous meeting only a few weeks earlier. However, with the vocal Manchester crowd behind him Hoy was not to be denied victory and he completed the win 2–0, the first British man to win the sprint title in 52 years since Reg Harris.

2008 Olympics

Hoy became the first British Olympian for 100 years to claim three golds at one games at the 2008 Summer Olympics in Beijing. This came when he won the men's keirin, the men's team sprint and also the men's individual sprint.

2008/09 season
Hoy did not race at the first major event of the 2009/10 season, the World Cup Classics Event in Manchester on 4 October – 2 November. He instead made an appearance to sign autographs and commentate with the BBC.
He made his return to racing in the UK at the Revolution 22 event in Manchester in December. He received a standing ovation from the Manchester faithful at the start of the event when he was introduced to the crowd. At this event Hoy won both the Sprint and Keirin competitions, defeating likes of Jason Kenny, Jamie Staff, Ross Edgar, Matthew Crampton and Teun Mulder along the way. Hoy competed in the World Cup Classics series' final event in Copenhagen, Denmark in February, helping his team to a gold medal in the team sprint event. However, he crashed out during the men's Keirin final and was forced to miss the final day of competition, including the men's sprint. Although at first, his injury seemed minor, he returned to Manchester where, following a scan, he was diagnosed with a serious de-gloving injury which finished his season and kept him off his bike for almost 3 months. He was unable to compete as planned at the Revolution 24 event in Manchester the following weekend, he did however make an appearance at the event. He had to pull out of the World Championships in Poland at the end of March, where he would have attempted to defend 2 World titles, because of the hip injury.

2009/10 season

Hoy started the 09/10 track season at the National Cycling Centre, Manchester, at the British National Championships where he took only his second (and third) ever individual national titles. He took gold medals in the Keirin, Sprint and was part of the Team Sprint Team representing team SKY along with Jamie Staff and Jason Kenny. Two weeks later, he raced in round one of the UCI World Cup at the same venue and took gold in the Men's Keirin. He then went into day 2 of the competition and took gold in the sprint event, beating fellow Brit Matthew Crampton in the final 2–0. A third World Cup gold came in the Team Sprint on the Sunday. Having ridden and won 12 events over the weekend, he withdrew from the International Japanese Keirin which was consequently won by Crampton.

At the 2010 UCI World Championships, Hoy was beaten in the quarter final of the men's sprint event by his German opponent, Robert Förstemann, who won after making an attack from the start line. He was part of the GB men's team sprint that took the bronze. In the Keirin event, Hoy won the gold medal, despite crashing in the heats, to take his tenth world title.

2010/11 season
Hoy lost in the first round of the men's sprint at the European Championships to Ireland's Felix English. At the Manchester World Cup event in February 2011, Hoy lost in the semi-finals to Jason Kenny. Hoy took the match sprint title at the British National Championships in October 2011.

2011/12 track season
At the 2012 World Cup event held in the new London Velodrome, Hoy won three medals. He won gold in the keirin and bronze in the team sprint, before winning gold in the Men's Sprint, losing just one race in four rounds.

2012 Olympics

Hoy was an ambassador for the 2012 Olympic Games in London. Hoy led Team GB out as the team's flag carrier at the opening ceremony. He then went on to win gold in the team sprint with Jason Kenny and Philip Hindes, setting a new world record in the velodrome and becoming Team GB's joint gold record holder with Sir Steve Redgrave's tally of five gold medals with a total of six medals (5 gold, 1 silver).

On 7 August 2012 Hoy won gold in the Keirin to overtake Sir Steve Redgrave and become the most successful British olympian ever, winning a total of 6 gold medals. This also made him the joint holder of most medals won by any British athlete in the Olympic Games with fellow cyclist Sir Bradley Wiggins and Jason Kenny.

Retirement
On 18 April 2013 Hoy announced his retirement from competitive cycling. He said he was very proud to have taken part in the transformation of the sport.

Motorsport career
Hoy's interest in motorsport competition led him to contest the inaugural season of the Radical Sportscars SR1 Cup, scooping his first motorsport podium at Snetterton in the same season. Hoy has since contested selected rounds of the Radical SR3 Challenge and Radical European Masters in Radical's SR3 RS and SR8 RX open sportscars. On 8 April 2014 it was announced that Hoy would be joining the British GT championship driving a Nissan GT-R Nismo GT3 with a view to competing in the 24 Hours of Le Mans in 2016.

Hoy took his first victory in international competition at the opening round of the 2015 European Le Mans Series at Silverstone where he drove a Ginetta-Nissan to a class win alongside team-mate Charlie Robertson. The pairing took another two wins in the series' LMP3 class, including at the penultimate round at Circuit Paul Ricard, which clinched them the class title with a round to spare.

He subsequently competed at the 2015 Race of Champions at the London Olympic Stadium, receiving a late invitation to race as part of Team All Stars in the Nations Cup alongside Romain Grosjean as a replacement for Jorge Lorenzo after the motorcyclist suffered leg burns as a result of post-race celebrations on his motorbike when he clinched that season's MotoGP title.

However Hoy and Grosjean were knocked out in the first round by the Young Stars team of Pascal Wehrlein and Jolyon Palmer.

In March 2016 it was confirmed that Hoy would be entered for the 2016 Le Mans 24 Hours, sharing a Ligier JS P2-Nissan with Andrea Pizzitola and Michael Munemann. He was the first Summer Olympic medallist to compete at Le Mans, the ninth former Olympian to race there and the second Olympic champion to do so, after alpine skier Henri Oreiller.

Hoy and his team-mates finished the race in 17th overall and 12th in class.

Complete British GT Championship results
(key) (Races in bold indicate pole position) (Races in italics indicate fastest lap)

Complete European Le Mans Series results

24 Hours of Le Mans results

24 Hours of Silverstone results

Complete FIA World Rallycross Championship results
(key)

Supercar

Hoy Bikes
Hoy unveiled the brand which bears his name in November 2012, three months after winning the double Olympic gold in London. The debut range included three road bikes and four city bikes, as well as a track bike. It was later extended by several other designs, including bicycles for children.

Personal life
Hoy is married to Sarra Kemp, Lady Hoy, a lawyer from Edinburgh. They got married in 2010 at St Giles' Cathedral, Edinburgh. They have a son, Callum, and a daughter, Chloe.

Hoy's autobiography was published in 2009. Hoy's first two children's fiction books, about a young cyclist called Flying Fergus, were published in 2016. In 2020, Hoy published another children's book titled 'Be Amazing'.

In April 2013, Hoy accepted the appointment of ambassador to the Royal Air Force Air Cadets and assumed the rank of Honorary Group Captain RAFVR(T). He has since relinquished this role. In 2013, Hoy was appointed as an ambassador for UNICEF UK, having been an International Inspiration ambassador for UNICEF since 2009.

Hoy has been Ambassador for SAMH (Scottish Association for Mental Health) since 2009. In that time he has devoted many hours to raising awareness of and funds for the mental health cause.

In December 2016 and December 2017, Hoy supported the Scottish Social Enterprise Social Bite by sleeping out at their Sleep in the Park events to end homelessness in Scotland.

Medal history

 World Championships
 1999 –  Team sprint
 2000 –  Team sprint
 2001 –  Team sprint
 2002 –  1 km time trial;  Team sprint
 2003 –  Team sprint
 2004 –  1 km time trial;  Team sprint
 2005 –  Team sprint;  1 km time trial
 2006 –  1 km time trial;  Team sprint
 2007 –  Keirin;  1 km time trial;  Team sprint
 2008 –  Sprint;  Keirin;  Team sprint
 2010 –  Keirin;  Team sprint
 2011 –  Keirin;  Team sprint;  Sprint
 2012 –  Keirin;  Sprint

 Olympic Games
 2000 –  Team sprint (with Craig MacLean and Jason Queally)
 2004 –  1 km Track time trial
 2008 –  Team sprint (with Jason Kenny and Jamie Staff);  Keirin;  Sprint
 2012 –  Team sprint (with Jason Kenny and Philip Hindes);  Keirin

 Track Cycling World Ranking
 2009–10 – 3rd Keirin
 2010–11 – 2nd Keirin, 3rd Team sprint
 2011–12  – 1st Keirin

 Commonwealth Games
 2002 –  1 km time trial;  Team sprint (with Craig MacLean and Ross Edgar)
 2006 –  Team sprint (with Craig MacLean and Ross Edgar);  1 km time trial

 Special awards
 2003, 2008 – BBC Scotland Sports Personality of the Year
 2008 – BBC Sports Personality of the Year
 2014 – BBC Sports Personality of the Year Lifetime Achievement Award

Honours
2005: Honorary Doctor of Science, University of Edinburgh
2005: Appointed a Member of the Most Excellent Order of the British Empire (MBE) "for services to cycling" in the 2005 New Year Honours.
2005: Honorary Doctorate from Heriot-Watt University
2008: Sportsman of the Year, elected by the Sports Journalists' Association, winning a ballot of its membership ahead of Formula One world champion Lewis Hamilton and Olympic sailor Ben Ainslie.
2008: BBC Sports Personality of the Year. He finished ahead of Formula One world champion Lewis Hamilton and Olympic swimmer Rebecca Adlington. Hoy became the second cyclist ever to win the award after Tom Simpson in 1965.
 2009: Honorary Doctor of Science, University of St Andrews
2009: Appointed Knight Bachelor in the 2009 New Year Honours "for services to Sport".
2009: Inducted to the University of Edinburgh's Sports Hall of Fame.
2009: Train operating company SouthEastern named a high-speed Class 395 train after him.
2012: The Sir Chris Hoy Velodrome, built for the Glasgow 2014 Commonwealth Games, is named in his honour.
2013: Honorary Group Captain RAFAC, Ambassador to the Royal Air Force Air Cadets.

Bibliography

Non Fiction
Chris Hoy: the Autobiography (2009, HarperCollins)

Children's fiction
Flying Fergus 2: The Great Cycle Challenge (2016, Bonnier Publishing Fiction);

See also

 List of multiple Olympic gold medalists
 2012 Olympics gold post boxes in the United Kingdom
City of Edinburgh Racing Club
Achievements of members of City of Edinburgh Racing Club
Sir Chris Hoy Velodrome

References

Further reading
Richard Moore, Heroes, Villains and Velodromes: Chris Hoy and Britain's Track Cycling Revolution (June 2008), HarperCollins; .

External links

 
 Chris Hoy profile , cyclingweekly.co.uk; accessed 2 April 2017. 
 
 HOY Bikes website, hoybikes.com; accessed 2 April 2017.
 
 

1976 births
Living people
Knights Bachelor
Alumni of the University of Edinburgh
BBC Sports Personality of the Year winners
BMX riders
Commonwealth Games gold medallists for Scotland
Commonwealth Games bronze medallists for Scotland
Commonwealth Games competitors for Scotland
Cyclists at the 2000 Summer Olympics
Cyclists at the 2002 Commonwealth Games
Cyclists at the 2004 Summer Olympics
Cyclists at the 2008 Summer Olympics
Cyclists at the 2012 Summer Olympics
Cyclists at the 2006 Commonwealth Games
24 Hours of Le Mans drivers
European Le Mans Series drivers
International GT Open drivers
World Rallycross Championship drivers
Medalists at the 2012 Summer Olympics
Medalists at the 2008 Summer Olympics
Medalists at the 2004 Summer Olympics
Members of the Order of the British Empire
Olympic cyclists of Great Britain
Olympic gold medallists for Great Britain
Olympic medalists in cycling
Olympic silver medallists for Great Britain
People educated at George Watson's College
Royal Air Force officers holding honorary commissions
Sportspeople from Edinburgh
Scottish autobiographers
Scottish children's writers
Scottish male cyclists
Scottish racing drivers
Sports scientists
People in sports awarded knighthoods
UCI Track Cycling World Champions (men)
Medalists at the 2000 Summer Olympics
Commonwealth Games medallists in cycling
Scottish Olympic medallists
Scottish track cyclists
BBC Sports Personality Lifetime Achievement Award recipients
Britcar 24-hour drivers
Scottish businesspeople
24H Series drivers
Multimatic Motorsports drivers
British GT Championship drivers
United Autosports drivers
Medallists at the 2002 Commonwealth Games
Medallists at the 2006 Commonwealth Games